John Hasbrouck Van Vleck (March 13, 1899 – October 27, 1980) was an American physicist and mathematician. He was co-awarded the Nobel Prize in Physics in 1977, for his contributions to the understanding of the behavior of electronic magnetism in solids.

Education and early life
Van Vleck was born to mathematician Edward Burr Van Vleck and Hester L. Raymond in Middletown, Connecticut, while his father was an assistant professor at Wesleyan University, and where his grandfather, astronomer John Monroe Van Vleck, was also a professor. He grew up in Madison, Wisconsin, and received an A.B. degree from the University of Wisconsin in 1920, before earning his Ph.D. at Harvard University in 1922 under the supervision of Edwin C. Kemble.

Career and research
He joined the University of Minnesota as an assistant professor in 1923, then moved to the University of Wisconsin before settling at Harvard. He also earned Honorary D. Sc., or D. Honoris Causa, degree from Wesleyan University in 1936.

J. H. Van Vleck established the fundamentals of the quantum mechanical theory of magnetism, crystal field theory and ligand field theory (chemical bonding in metal complexes). He is regarded as the Father of Modern Magnetism.

During World War II, J. H. Van Vleck worked on radar at the MIT Radiation Lab. He was half time at the Radiation Lab and half time on the staff at Harvard. He showed that at about 1.25-centimeter wavelength water molecules in the atmosphere would lead to troublesome absorption and that at 0.5-centimeter wavelength there would be a similar absorption by oxygen molecules.
This was to have important consequences not just for military (and civil) radar systems but later for the new science of radioastronomy.

J. H. Van Vleck participated in the Manhattan Project. In June 1942, J. Robert Oppenheimer held a summer study for confirming the concept and feasibility of a nuclear weapon at the University of California, Berkeley. Eight theoretical scientists, including J. H. Van Vleck, attended it. From July to September, the theoretical study group examined and developed the principles of atomic bomb design.

J. H. Van Vleck's theoretical work led to the establishment of the Los Alamos Nuclear Weapons Laboratory. He also served on the Los Alamos Review committee in 1943. The committee, established by General Leslie Groves, also consisted of W. K. Lewis of MIT, Chairman; E. L. Rose, of Jones & Lamson; E. B. Wilson of Harvard; and Richard C. Tolman, Vice Chairman of NDRC.  The committee's important contribution (originating with Rose) was a reduction in the size of the firing gun for the Little Boy atomic bomb, a concept that eliminated additional design weight and sped up production of the bomb for its eventual release over Hiroshima. However, it was not employed for the Fat Man bomb at Nagasaki, which relied on implosion of a plutonium shell to reach critical mass.  

The philosopher and historian of science Thomas Kuhn completed a Ph.D. in physics under Van Vleck's supervision at Harvard.

In 1961/62 he was George Eastman Visiting Professor at University of Oxford and held a professorship at Balliol College.

In 1950 he became foreign member of the Royal Netherlands Academy of Arts and Sciences. He was awarded the National Medal of Science in 1966 and the Lorentz Medal in 1974.
For his contributions to the understanding of the behavior of electrons in magnetic solids, Van Vleck was awarded the Nobel Prize in Physics 1977, along with Philip W. Anderson and Sir Nevill Mott. Van Vleck transformations, Van Vleck paramagnetism and Van Vleck formula are named after him.

Van Vleck died in Cambridge, Massachusetts, aged 81.

Awards and honors
He was awarded the Irving Langmuir Award in 1965, the  National Medal of Science in 1966 and elected a Foreign Member of the Royal Society (ForMemRS) in 1967. He was awarded the Elliott Cresson Medal in 1971, the Lorentz Medal in 1974 and the Nobel Prize in Physics in 1977.

Personal life
J. H. Van Vleck met Abigail Pearson, a student at University of Minnesota, during his professorship there, and married her on June 10, 1927. He and his wife Abigail were also important art collectors, particularly in the medium of Japanese woodblock prints (principally Ukiyo-e), known as Van Vleck Collection. It was inherited from his father Edward Burr Van Vleck.  They donated it to the Chazen Museum of Art in Madison, Wisconsin in 1980s.

Publications 

The Absorption of Radiation by Multiply Periodic Orbits, and its Relation to the Correspondence Principle and the Rayleigh–Jeans Law. Part I. Some Extensions of the Correspondence Principle, Physical Review, vol. 24, Issue 4, pp. 330–346 (1924)
The Absorption of Radiation by Multiply Periodic Orbits, and its Relation to the Correspondence Principle and the Rayleigh–Jeans Law. Part II. Calculation of Absorption by Multiply Periodic Orbits, Physical Review, vol. 24, Issue 4, pp. 347–365 (1924)
The Statistical Interpretation of Various Formulations of Quantum Mechanics, Journal of the Franklin Institute, vol. 207, Issue 4, pp. 475–494 (1929)
Quantum Principles and Line Spectra, (Bulletin of the National Research Council; v. 10, pt 4, no. 54, 1926)
The Theory of Electric and Magnetic Susceptibilities (Oxford at Clarendon, 1932).
Quantum Mechanics, The Key to Understanding Magnetism, Nobel Lecture, December 8, 1977
The Correspondence Principle in the Statistical Interpretation of Quantum Mechanics Proceedings of the National Academy of Sciences of USA, vol. 14, pp. 178–188 (1928)

References

External links

  including the Nobel Lecture, December 8, 1977 Quantum Mechanics The Key to Understanding Magnetism
 The Theory of Electric and Magnetic Susceptibilities 
 John Hasbrouck van Vleck
 Duncan, Anthony and Janssen, Michel. "On the verge of Undeutung in Minnesota: Van Vleck and the correspondence principle. Part one," Archive for History of Exact Sciences 2007, 61:6, pages 553–624. 
 Chazen Museum of Art
 Oral history interview transcript with John Hasbrouck Van Vleck 14 October 1963, American Institute of Physics, Niels Bohr Library & Archives
 Oral history interview transcript with John Hasbrouck Van Vleck 28 February 1966, American Institute of Physics, Niels Bohr Library & Archives
 Oral history interview transcript with John Hasbrouck Van Vleck 28 January 1977, American Institute of Physics, Niels Bohr Library & Archives

1899 births
1980 deaths
People from Middletown, Connecticut
Harvard University alumni
University of Minnesota faculty
Scientists from Madison, Wisconsin
American Nobel laureates
20th-century American physicists
American people of Dutch descent
Fellows of Balliol College, Oxford
University of Wisconsin–Madison alumni
Members of the International Academy of Quantum Molecular Science
Members of the Royal Netherlands Academy of Arts and Sciences
National Medal of Science laureates
Nobel laureates in Physics
Lorentz Medal winners
Foreign Members of the Royal Society
Fellows of the American Physical Society
University of Wisconsin–Madison faculty
Harvard University faculty
Wesleyan University people
Hollis Chair of Mathematics and Natural Philosophy
20th-century American mathematicians
Manhattan Project people
Members of the Royal Swedish Academy of Sciences
Presidents of the American Physical Society